Rose Kerketta (born 5 December 1940) is a woman writer, poet, thinker and tribal rights activist. She was born in Kaisara, Ranchi District, Bihar which is now Simdega District, Jharkhand to a Kharia family. She has written several books about tribal language and culture.

References 

1940 births
Living people
Poets from Jharkhand
Women writers from Jharkhand
Adivasi women writers
Indian women activists
Indian human rights activists
20th-century Indian poets
20th-century Indian women writers
Indian women poets
Activists from Jharkhand
Kharia people